Wild Thing is a podcast about the relationship between science and society. It is hosted by Laura Krantz and produced by Foxtopus Ink. In 2006 Krantz learned that she was related to anthropologist Grover Krantz, who had spent much of his career writing about and hunting for Sasquatch, after she read an article in the Washington Post. At the time, Krantz was working at National Public Radio and thought that she needed to dig deeper. Through her reporting she came to understand that the search for Sasquatch spoke to important questions about human evolution, conspiracy theories, and the human connection to the natural world. The second season of Wild Thing concerns the search for extraterrestrial life. The third season explores the future (and past) of nuclear power.

Episodes 

Season 2: Space Invaders

In addition to the main episodes, both seasons also include bonus interviews. Season one includes conversations with well known cryptozoologist Bob Gimlin, director William Dear, Sasquatch hunter Peter Byrne and Bigfoot erotica author Virginia Wade. In season two Krantz speaks with astrophysicist Neil deGrasse Tyson, science YouTuber Joe Scott, as well as astronomers involved with searching for life on Venus and Mars.

Critical reception 
Wild Thing garnered largely positive press from around the country. The Atlantic announced Wild Thing as one of the best podcasts of 2018, largely owing to its gentle handing of a topic that many people view with skepticism. Emily Todd VanDerWeff of Vox wrote: "It’s smart, well produced, well written, and intelligently structured." The Los Angeles Times called Wild Thing "Serial for Sasquatches." Mashable named it the most "binge-worth podcasts of 2018" The Atlanticnamed season 2 one of the best podcasts of 2020. The show was also featured in Rolling Stone, Outside Magazine, and Scientific American.

References

External links 
 Official Website

2018 podcast debuts
Audio podcasts
American podcasts